Višnja Gora (also Weichselburg, Weichselberg) is a town in the Municipality of Ivančna Gorica in central Slovenia. It is one of the best-preserved medieval towns in Slovenia. The area is part of the historical region of Lower Carniola. The municipality is now included in the Central Slovenia Statistical Region. It includes the hamlets of Žabjek, Na Štacjonu, and Grintavec, as well as the former hamlet of Suhi Malen.

Geography 
The town is located in the Višnjica Valley 20 km southeast of Ljubljana just south of the A2 Slovenian motorway. Nearby is the Kosca Valley with the highest waterfall on a travertine foundation in Slovenia. Regular long-distance bus and rail-lines connect Višnja Gora to Ivančna Gorica and Ljubljana.

History
Višnja Gora was granted town rights in 1478. In the same period, a coat of arms showing a masonry wall with doors and two roofed towers was adopted. The snail representing a local legend was added later. The citizens of the town were given a golden snail shell for nursing the Venetian doge's son wounded in the Battle of Sisak (1593) by his relatives. The golden shell has since been lost, but the legend remains. During the Second World War, Višnja Gora was bombarded by German forces on 22 September 1943. At the end of October 1943, Partisan forces burned Turn Castle, the courthouse, and the school in the town.

Castles

The old centre is built on a hill (384 m) under the ruins of Višnja Gora Castle, generally known as Old Castle, once home of the Višnja Gora knights. A second castle, Turn Castle, stood west of the town center. It was also later known as the Codelli Manor and was burned by the Partisans in October 1943.

Recreation
The 12 km Jurčič Trail is named after Josip Jurčič, author of the first Slovene novel, Deseti brat, who attended primary school in Višnja Gora. Part of the trail has been recently turned into a forest trail known as Po poteh višnjanskega polža (The Višnja Gora Snail Trail).

Notable people
Notable people that were born or lived in Višnja Gora include:
Josip Jurčič (1844–1881), author
Ive Krevs (1912–1990), Yugoslav Olympic athlete
Pashal Skerbinc (1780–1824), religious writer

Gallery

References

External links

 Višnja Gora on Geopedia.si
 Višnja Gora (The Official Website)
 Višnja Gora (The Official Travel Guide by Slovenian Tourist Board)
 Višnja Gora (images at burger.net)

Populated places in the Municipality of Ivančna Gorica
Cities and towns in Lower Carniola